

Newly named archosauromorphs

Newly named basal archosauromorphs

Newly named dinosaurs

Plesiosaurs

Newly named plesiosaurs

References

1860s in paleontology
Paleontology
Paleontology 5
Paleontology, 1865 In